Alarm in the Circus is an East German crime film directed by Gerhard Klein. It was released in 1954.

Plot
Klaus and Max are two poor boys from West Berlin, whose families are to poor to pay for their higher education. They face a bleak future. Their only hobby is boxing, and they are both desperate to purchase real boxing gloves. The two meet Klott, a gangster who owns a bar that serves American soldiers. Klott offers to pay them if they would assist him to steal valuable horses from a circus in East Berlin. The two agree and travel to the Soviet zone, where they meet a girl named Helli, a member of the Free German Youth, who explains to them that in the communist east, the lack of money will not bar their way to education. The two realize the error of their ways, contact the People's Police and help the officers hinder Klott's plans and arrest the other thieves working for him. The two remain in East Berlin.

Cast
 Erwin Geschonneck as Klott
 Uwe-Jens Pape as Jimmy
 Karl Kendzia as Batta
 Ulrich Thein as Herbert
 Hans Winter as Klaus
 Ernst-Georg Schwill as Max
 Gertrud Keller as Helli
 Annelise Matschulat as Mrs. Weigel
 Siegfried Weiß as Hepfield
 Peter Dornseif as Police officer
 Günther Haack as Catcher
 Horst Giese as uncredited role

Production
Alarm in the Circus was the first of the so-called "Berlin films", a trilogy of pictures that were made in collaboration between director Gerhard Klein and writer Wolfgang Kohlhaase, that were notable for their pioneering of neorealism in German cinema and for the manner in which they reflected the reality of the city in the years before the building of the Berlin Wall, that was critical of the Americanization of its western side. It was followed by the sequels A Berlin Romance (1956) and Berlin - Schönhauser Corner (1957).

Reception
Alarm in the Circus was viewed by 3.6 million people in 1954, becoming the highest-grossing East German film of the year, and sold 5,515,078 tickets in total. sold Klein and Kohlhaase both won the National Prize, 3rd degree, for their work on the film.

The Catholic Film Service defined the film as "exciting, well-made crime film that presents the background of a divided Berlin in a highly authentic manner." Peter C. Rollins and John E. O'Connor wrote that it had "drawn a clear contrast between the city's halves that fit the official communist paradigm."

References

External links

Alarm in the Circus original poster on ostfilm.de.
Alarm in the Circus on filmportal.de.
Alarm in the Circus on cinema.de

1954 films
1954 crime films
German crime films
DEFA films
1950s German-language films
Films set in Berlin
German black-and-white films
German children's films
Circus films
1950s children's films
1950s German films